

Rhode Island state forests

See also
 List of U.S. National Forests

Rhode Island
State forests